Eduardo Roberto Stinghen (born 4 July 1944) best known as Ado, is a former Brazilian footballer who played as a goalkeeper.

In his career (1964–1984) he played for Londrina, Corinthians, America-RJ, Atlético Mineiro, Portuguesa, Velo Clube, Fortaleza, Ferroviário and Bragantino. He was selected in the Brazilian team for their win in the 1970 World Cup without playing any games in the tournament.

References

External links

  http://100xcorinthians.blogspot.com/2010/10/grandes-idolos-ado.html Original Page is in Portuguese
 

1946 births
Living people
Brazilian footballers
Association football goalkeepers
1970 FIFA World Cup players
FIFA World Cup-winning players
Fortaleza Esporte Clube players
Clube Atlético Mineiro players
Sport Club Corinthians Paulista players
Associação Portuguesa de Desportos players
Santos FC players
Clube Atlético Bragantino players
Ferroviário Atlético Clube (CE) players
Londrina Esporte Clube players
America Football Club (RJ) players
Brazil international footballers
Brazilian people of German descent